was a Japanese politician who served as governor of Toyama Prefecture (1941–1943), governor of Niigata Prefecture (1945) and the second Governor of Hokkaido (1959–1971). He was a member of the Liberal Democratic Party. He was a graduate of the University of Tokyo. He was a recipient of the Order of the Rising Sun. His second son was Nobutaka Machimura, who was twice Minister of Foreign Affairs of Japan and Chief Cabinet Secretary of Japan.

Bibliography
『町村金五伝』　北海タイムス社　1982年

|-

|-

|-

|-

|-

|-

|-

|-

|-

1900 births
1992 deaths
Japanese politicians
Governors of Hokkaido
Grand Cordons of the Order of the Rising Sun
University of Tokyo alumni
Governors of Toyama Prefecture
Governors of Niigata Prefecture
People from Sapporo